Edward Vaughan Evarts (March 28, 1926 – July 2, 1985) was an American neuroscientist. He pioneered single-unit recordings from the brains of awake, behaving monkeys.

Life
Evarts received his undergraduate degree at Harvard College and an M.D. degree from Harvard Medical School in 1948. Evarts undertook an internship at Boston's Peter Bent Brigham Hospital, worked with Karl Lashley at Yerkes Laboratories of Primate Biology in Orange Park, Florida, and at the National Hospital for Nervous Diseases in London. After a residency in psychiatry at the Payne Whitney Institute in New York, Evarts joined NIMH in Bethesda, Maryland where he was appointed as head of the Section on Physiology at the Laboratory of Clinical Science and became chief of the Laboratory of Neurophysiology in 1970. Evarts remained in that position until he died, in his laboratory, July 2, 1985.

Evarts started his neurophysiological research by conducting ablation studies of visual and auditory cortex in monkeys.  He also studied effects of LSD and post-tetanic potentiation in the cat visual system. Evarts made his most significant contribution to the field of neuroscience and motor control by pioneering electrophysiological recordings from single cortical neurons in awake monkeys. In his early studies using this technique, he compared sleep and waking states. He then conducted experiments that involved single-unit recordings from sensorimotor cortex in monkeys performing operantly conditioned movements.  He observed modulations in the activity of single neurons that reflected movement parameters.

Based on these observations, he developed the concepts of "motor set" and "transcortical reflex". "Psychomotor set" describes neural activity that occurs when a motor action in response to a stimulus ("go-cue") is being prepared. "Transcortical reflex" describes the operation of motor cortex in the way similar to spinal reflexes that influence spinal motoneuron firing.

Influence
The work of Evarts gave rise to a new field in neuroscience. His followers use single electrodes and electrode arrays temporarily inserted or implanted in the brain to record brain signals during different types of behavioral and cognitive activity and thereby gain knowledge about how the brain works.  The knowledge accumulated in this research recently resulted in creation of brain-computer interfaces—electronic devices that sample neuronal activity in the brain, decode its meaning and use decoded information to operate external devices, such as robots.

Prediction in 1956 concerning antipsychotic drugs and life expectancy
At a meeting in 1956 of the National Academy of Sciences, Evarts contended that antipsychotics such as the then new chlorpromazine would cause short-term benefits to patients, but at the cost of reducing life expectancy.

References

External links
William Thomas Thach, Jr., "Edward Vaughan Evarts", Biographical Memoirs of the National Academy of Sciences (2000)

American neuroscientists
1926 births
1985 deaths
Harvard Medical School alumni
Behavioral neuroscientists
Harvard College alumni
Members of the National Academy of Medicine